Lyubomirovo is a rural locality (a selo) in Lyubomirovskoye Rural Settlement, Sheksninsky District, Vologda Oblast, Russia. The population was 339 as of 2002. There are 5 streets.

Geography 
Lyubomirovo is located 25 km southeast of Sheksna (the district's administrative centre) by road. Levo is the nearest rural locality.

References 

Rural localities in Sheksninsky District